Geremías Meléndez Rhenals (born 5 May 1995) is a Venezuelan footballer who plays as a centre back.

Career

Club career

References

External links
 

1995 births
Living people
Venezuelan footballers
Venezuelan expatriate footballers
Association football defenders
Deportivo JBL del Zulia players
Venados F.C. players
Venezuelan Primera División players
Ascenso MX players
Venezuelan expatriate sportspeople in Mexico
Expatriate footballers in Mexico
Sportspeople from Maracaibo